The Alfa Romeo Racing C39 is a Formula One car constructed by Alfa Romeo Racing to compete in the 2020 Formula One World Championship. The car was driven by Kimi Räikkönen and Antonio Giovinazzi, returning for their second year with the team. Robert Kubica acted as the team's reserve driver. The car was planned to make its competitive debut at the 2020 Australian Grand Prix, but this was delayed when the race was cancelled and the next three events in Bahrain, Vietnam and China were postponed in response to the COVID-19 pandemic. The C39 made its debut at the 2020 Austrian Grand Prix.

The chassis was designed by Jan Monchaux, Luca Furbatto, Lucia Conconi, Alessandro Cinelli and Nicolas Hennel with the car being powered with a customer Ferrari powertrain.

Competition history 
Prior to pre season testing, Alfa Romeo painted the car in a "snake skin" livery. The car then went back to its competition livery for pre season testing. At the season opening 2020 Austrian Grand Prix, Kimi Räikkönen's right front tyre came off prompting retirement. Antonio Giovinazzi finished 9th, giving Alfa Romeo two points. At the 2020 Styrian Grand Prix, Räikkönen finished in 11th place and Giovinazzi finished 14th, both 1 lap down. At the 2020 Hungarian Grand Prix, Räikkönen was too far forward at the start, rendering him out of position. He was given a five-second penalty for this during the race. The cars were the last two finishers, after qualifying on the back row. Although the car began the season at the back of the grid, it has gradually improved as the season has progressed, including a 12th-place finish ahead of both works Ferraris by Räikkönen at the Belgian Grand Prix. As with the Ferrari SF1000, and fellow Ferrari engine customers Haas' entry, the VF-20, the car has been consistently hampered by a lack of power from its Ferrari engine and thus has struggled to compete with other midfield teams, especially at power-dependent circuits. In most races, they race at the back of the grid with Haas and Williams.

Later use 
A modified C39 was used during testing of the 2022 tyre compounds after the 2021 Abu Dhabi Grand Prix.

Complete Formula One results
(key)

 Driver failed to finish the race, but was classified as they had completed over 90% of the winner's race distance.

References

External links

C39
2020 Formula One season cars